Ann Kiyomura and Kazuko Sawamatsu were the defending champions, but Sawamatsu did not compete. Kiyomura partnered with Mona Guerrant, but they lost in the third round to Lesley Charles and Sue Mappin.

Chris Evert and Martina Navratilova defeated Billie Jean King and Betty Stöve in the final, 6–1, 3–6, 7–5 to win the ladies' doubles tennis title at the 1976 Wimbledon Championships. It was the only Wimbledon title and 3rd Grand Slam title for Evert, and the 1st Wimbledon title and 2nd Grand Slam title for Navratilova, in their respective doubles careers.

Seeds

  Billie Jean King /  Betty Stöve (final)
  Chris Evert /  Martina Navratilova (champions)
  Olga Morozova /  Virginia Wade (first round)
  Evonne Cawley /  Peggy Michel (third round)

Draw

Finals

Top half

Section 1

Section 2

Bottom half

Section 3

Section 4

References

External links

1976 Wimbledon Championships – Women's draws and results at the International Tennis Federation

Women's Doubles
Wimbledon Championship by year – Women's doubles
Wimbledon Championships
Wimbledon Championships